Bastards from the Bush is a 1998 Australian documentary focusing on the friendship between Australian figures Les Murray and Bob Ellis. It covers a trip the two men take to visit key places growing up together.

References

External links
Bastards from the Bush at Australian Screen Online

1998 films
Australian documentary television films
1990s English-language films